Wendell Wallach (born April 21, 1946) is a bioethicist and author focused on the ethics and governance of emerging technologies, in particular artificial intelligence and neuroscience. He is a scholar at Yale University's Interdisciplinary Center for Bioethics, a senior advisor to The Hastings Center, a Carnegie/Uehiro Senior Fellow at the Carnegie Council for Ethics in International Affairs, and a fellow at the Center for Law and Innovation at the Sandra Day O'Connor School of Law at Arizona State University. He has written two books on the ethics of emerging technologies.: "Moral Machines: Teaching Robots Right from Wrong" (2010)  and "A Dangerous Master: How to Keep Technology from Slipping Beyond Our Control" (2015). Wallach speaks eloquently about his professional, personal and spiritual journey, as well as some of the biggest conundrums facing humanity at the wake of the bio/digital revolution in this podcast published by the Carnegie Council for Ethics in International Affairs (CCEIA).

Early life 
Wallach was born in Torrington, Connecticut. He received his Bachelor of Arts from Wesleyan University in 1968. In 1971 he received his master's degree in Education from Harvard University, and afterwards did a stint in India where he explored spirituality and processes of cognition. In 1978 he published his first book, Silent Learning: The Undistracted Mind (Journey Publications, 1978).

Career

Computer consulting 
In the 1980s and 1990s, Wallach worked in computer consulting as founder and president of Farpoint Solutions LLC and Omnia Consulting Inc. These groups served clients such as the State of Connecticut, PepsiCo International, and United Aircraft. He sold his interests in both companies in 2001.

Machine ethics 
In 2004 and 2005, Wallach taught undergraduate seminars at Yale University about robot ethics, and in 2005 he became chair of the Technology and Ethics Study Group at Yale University ISPS Interdisciplinary Center for Bioethics. In 2009, Wallach published Moral Machines: Teaching Robots Right From Wrong (co-authored with Colin Allen, Indiana University), which discusses issues in AI ethics and machine morality. It is considered the "first book to examine the challenge of building artificial moral agents." In 2015 Wallach became a senior advisor on synthetic biology to The Hastings Center, which is an "independent, nonpartisan, interdisciplinary research institute" focused on "social and ethical issues in health care, science, and technology." Wallach received the World Technology Network award for ethics in 2014. He also won the World Technology Network award for media and journalism in 2015, in recognition of his second book, A Dangerous Master: How to keep technology from slipping beyond our control, which discusses the ethics and governance of various emerging technologies. In this book, Wallach argues that "technological development is at risk of becoming a juggernaut beyond human control," and proposes "solutions for regaining control of our technological destiny." In 2015, he received a grant from Elon Musk and the Future of Life Institute for a project titled "Control and Responsible Innovation in the Development of Autonomous Machines".

Wallach is the editor of the Library of Essays on Ethics and Emerging Technologies, where he co-edited a volume on Robot Ethics and Machine Ethics with Peter Asaro, and a volume Emerging Technologies: Ethics, Law, and Governance with Gary Marchant. He received a Fulbright Scholarship as a Visiting Research Chair at the University of Ottawa for 2015–2016, and in 2018 he was named the Distinguished Austin J. Fagothey Visiting professor at Santa Clara University. Wallach was appointed by the World Economic Forum (WEF) to co-chair the Global Future Council on Technology, Values, and Policy for the 2016–2018 term. He also sits on the WEF AI council (2018–present), and is the lead organizer for the International Congress for the Governance of AI.

United Nations 
In 2016, Wallach gave testimony at the United Nations (UN) Third Convention on Certain Conventional Weapons (CCW) Meeting of Experts on the issue of predictability in lethal autonomous weapons systems, The testimony argued that "while increasing autonomy, improving intelligence, and machine learning can boost the system's accuracy in performing certain tasks, they can also increase the unpredictability in how a system performs overall. Risk will rise relative to the power of the munitions the system can discharge." He later served as a member of the UN Global Pulse Expert Group on Governance and Data of AI in 2019, which called for responsible development of artificial intelligence and other emerging technologies to reach the UN's 2030 Sustainable Development Goals. In addition, he served as an advisor to the Secretary Generals Higher-Level Panel on Digital Cooperation, and was cited in their 2019 report "The Age of Digital Interdependence."

Personal life 
Wallach is married to Nancy Wallach, and they live in Bloomfield, Connecticut. His hobbies include skiing, hiking, and building stained glass windows.

In the media 

 In 2007, Wallach spoke at the Singularity Summit in San Francisco, CA, titled "The Road to Singularity: Comedic Complexity, Technological Thresholds, and Bioethical Broad jumps on the Route".
In 2009, Wallach spoke at a panel at Woodstock Film Festival titled "Redesigning Humanity" with Ray Kurzeil and Martine Rothblatt.
In 2009, Wesleyan University Alumni Magazine did a profile on Wallach.
 Wallach was featured in the film titled Honda Dreams: Living With Robots, directed by Joe Berlinger, which debuted at the Sundance Film Festival in February 2010.
In 2013, Wallach gave a TEDx UConn talk titled "Emerging Technology - Hype vs. Reality"
 In 2014, Wallach was featured in an article in The Atlantic, "The Military Wants to Teach Robots Right From Wrong"
 In 2015, Business Insider featured Wallach in an article titled "We've reached a tipping point where technology is now destroying more jobs than it creates, researcher warns."
 In 2016, Wallach reviewed John Markoff's book "Machines of Loving Grace" in The Washington Post. In the same article, Wallach briefly reviews "Our Robots, Ourselves" by David A. Mindell and "We, Robots" by Curtis White.
In 2016, Wallach spoke at the World Science Festival on the question "Can technology lower healthcare costs?" with Eric Horvitz and Bertram Malle.
In 2016, Wallach spoke at a Carnegie Council For International Affairs event, titled "Global Ethics Forum: The Pros, Cons, and Ethical Dilemmas of Artificial Intelligence."
 In 2016, Wallach spoke on a WEF panel titled "Human vs Machine: The Significance of AlphaGo" with Lee Sedol.
In 2016, Wallach was a guest on an episode of the broadcast show "The Open Mind," titled "Angels and Demons of A.I."
In 2017, Wallach spoke on an AI panel with Stuart Russell, Eliezer Yudkowsky, and Max Tegmark.
 In 2017, Wallach spoke at Davos on a WEF panel on driverless cars titled "Shifting gears to driverless" with Violeta Bulc, Carlos Ghosn and Paul Jacobs.
 In 2107, Wallach was a guest on The Wright Show with Robert Wright, where he discusses the dangers of artificial intelligence and biotechnology.
In 2017, Wallach spoke at a WEF event "Artificial Intelligence Unleashed" with Vishal Sikka (then CEO of Infosys) and Ya-Qin Zhang (President of Baidu).
 In 2018, Wallach spoke on a panel titled "Control and Responsible Innovation of Artificial Intelligence" at a Carnegie Council for Ethics in International Affairs event.
 In 2018, Wallach was interviewed at the AI for Good Summit by the ITU.
In 2018, Wallach spoke at a WEF event titled "Shaping the Future of Artificial Intelligence in China."

Books

References 

Artificial intelligence ethicists
1946 births
Living people
Wesleyan University alumni
Harvard Graduate School of Education alumni
21st-century American non-fiction writers
Yale University faculty
Hastings Center Fellows